The 2017 Prince Edward Island Scotties Tournament of Hearts, the provincial women's curling championship of Prince Edward Island, was held from January 18 to 22 at the Silver Fox Curling and Yacht Community Complex in Summerside, Prince Edward Island. The winning Robyn MacPhee rink represented Prince Edward Island at the 2017 Scotties Tournament of Hearts in St. Catharines, Ontario.

The MacPhee team came from behind to win in the championship final over Veronica Smith by a score of 7–5. The event was held in conjunction with the 2017 PEI Tankard (the men's provincial championship) as part of a "pilot project" by Curl P.E.I., the island's provincial curling association. The Silver Fox club was specifically chosen as the venue because has the most sheets (six) in the province.

Teams

Knockout Draw Brackets
Brackets:

A Event

B Event

C Event

Playoffs
MacPhee Needs To Be Beaten Twice

Semifinal
Sunday, January 22, 2:30 pm

Final
Not needed

References

External links

Prince Edward Island
Scotties Tournament of Hearts, 2017
Scotties Tournament of Hearts, 2017
Scotties Tournament of Hearts
January 2017 sports events in Canada